Pashime, also Bashime ( ba-si-meKI),  was an ancient region of southern Mesopotamia. It has recently been identified with Tell Abu Sheeja, Iraq, about 7 km from Iraq's border with Iran. Pashime corresponded to an area of interaction between Mesopotamia and Elam. Its patron god was Shuda. The city of Pashime was previously thought to be located on the Persian Gulf.

A stele was discovered in Tell Abu Sheeja with the name of a Governor Ilšu-rabi, who has the same name as Ilšu-rabi the Governor of Pashime in the Manishtushu Obelisk inscription. The inscription on the stele reads:

Reference

Elam
Ancient Mesopotamia